This was the 1996–97 Alpenliga season, the sixth season of the multi-national ice hockey league. 11 teams participated in the league, and VEU Feldkirch of Austria won the championship by defeating Olimpija Ljubljana of Slovenia.

Regular season

Playoffs

Group phase

Final
 HDD Olimpija Ljubljana – VEU Feldkirch: 4:4 (2:2, 1:2, 1:0)
 VEU Feldkirch – Olimpija Ljubljana: 6:1 (1:0, 2:0, 3:1)

External links
 1996-97 season

Alpenliga seasons
2
Alpenliga
Alpenliga
Alpenliga